Norman Levi Bowen FRS (June 21, 1887 – September 11, 1956) was a Canadian geologist. Bowen "revolutionized experimental petrology and our understanding of mineral crystallization". Beginning geology students are familiar with Bowen's reaction series depicting how different minerals crystallize under varying pressures and temperatures."

Career
Bowen conducted experimental research at the Geophysical Laboratory, Carnegie Institution for Science of Washington from 1912 to 1937. He published The Evolution of the Igneous Rocks in 1928. This book set the stage for a geochemical and geophysical foundation for the study of rocks and minerals.

Personal life
Born in Kingston, Ontario, Canada, Bowen married Mary Lamont in 1911, and they had a daughter, Catherine.

Awards and honours
Bowen was awarded the Penrose Medal of the Geological Society of America in 1941 and served as their president in 1945. He was elected a Foreign Member of the Royal Society (ForMemRS) in 1949.

The Norman L. Bowen Award, awarded annually by the American Geophysical Union, is named in his honour.

The astronauts of Apollo 17 named a small lunar crater after him.

References

Further reading

 Norman L. Bowen, science.ca Profile. Available from: http://www.science.ca/scientists/scientistprofile.php?pID=271
 Yoder, H. S., Jr. Norman L. Bowen: The Experimental Approach to Petrology. GSA Today 5 (1998): 10–11. Available: https://web.archive.org/web/20130501133735/http://www.gsahist.org/gsat/gt98may10_11.pdf
 Yoder, H. S., Jr. Norman L. Bowen (1887–1956), MIT Class of 1912, First Predoctoral Fellow of the Geophysical Laboratory. Earth Sciences History 1 (1992): 45–55. Available: https://web.archive.org/web/20050306092622/http://vgp.agu.org/bowen_paper/bowen_paper.html
 Norman Levi Bowen Papers, 1907–1980 (Bulk 1907–1955), Geophysical Laboratory, Carnegie Institution of Washington, D.C., Finding aid written by: Jennifer Snyder, March 2004, PDF available: https://web.archive.org/web/20050222182019/http://hq.ciw.edu/legacy/findingaids/bowen.pdf
 Strickler, Mike, Ask GeoMan..., What is Bowen's Reaction Series?, http://homework.uoregon.edu/mstrick/AskGeoMan/geoQuerry32.html
 https://web.archive.org/web/20050325182852/http://carnegieinstitution.org/legacy/findingaids/bowen.html Bowen bibliography site
 https://web.archive.org/web/20051003223226/http://www.agu.org/inside/awardees.html#BowenList of Bowen Award winners

Canadian geochemists
Petrologists
Fellows of the Royal Society of Canada
Penrose Medal winners
1887 births
1956 deaths
People from Kingston, Ontario
Wollaston Medal winners
Foreign Members of the Royal Society
Members of the United States National Academy of Sciences
Presidents of the Geological Society of America
Canadian Fellows of the Royal Society